The 1916–17 PCHA season was the sixth season of the professional men's ice hockey Pacific Coast Hockey Association league. Season play ran from December 1, 1916, until March 2, 1917. The season was expanded to 24 games per team, except that the final game was cancelled. The Seattle Metropolitans club would be PCHA champions. After the season the club would play the Stanley Cup finals series against the Montreal Canadiens, NHA champions. Seattle would win the best-of-five series 3–1 to win the Cup.

League business
In the fall of 1916, the Canadian government expropriated Victoria's Patrick Arena for war-time training purposes, making the arena unavailable for ice hockey use. It was decided to move the Victoria Aristocrats to Spokane, Washington. This left Vancouver as the only Canadian team. The experiment in Spokane was not a success due to poor attendance. On February 15, 1917, the Spokane Arena announced that the remaining home games would be played in the other team's arenas. The final regular season game between Vancouver and Spokane was subsequently canceled.

Regular season

Final standings
Note: W = Wins, L = Losses, T = Ties, GF= Goals For, GA = Goals against

Schedule and results

Source: Coleman 1966.

Player statistics

Goaltending averages

Scoring leaders

See also
 1916–17 NHA season
 1916 in sports
 1917 in sports
 Pacific Coast Hockey Association
 List of pre-NHL seasons

References

Bibliography

Notes

 
Pacific Coast Hockey Association seasons
PCHA
PCHA